Monticello is a city next to the Mississippi River in Wright County, Minnesota, United States. The population was 14,455 at the 2020 census.

Geography
The city's latitude is 45.305 degrees North and its longitude is 93.793 degrees West. Its elevation is 922 feet. Monticello is in the Central time zone.

Parks
Monticello has an extensive parks and pathway system, including 28 city-owned parks and miles of winding trails. Lake Maria State Park, Montissippi Regional Park and the Harry Larsen Memorial Park are three of the largest. At Swan Park, each winter between  December and March, as many as 2,700 trumpeter swans nest near Mississippi Drive in Monticello, as the Mississippi River is heated from warm water discharged by the Monticello Nuclear Generating Plant.

The City of Monticello and Wright County partnered and acquired 1,200 acres of open space in Wright County, known as the Bertram Chain of Lakes. The Bertram Chain includes four lakes and acres of undisturbed shoreline, natural habitat, and oak forest, 812 of which are open for public enjoyment. It provides users access to 4 miles of hiking trails, 10 miles of single-track mountain biking trails, beach at Bertram Lake for swimming, and carry-in access to Long Lake, which allow the opportunity to paddle Long, Mud and First Lakes. Winter activities include fat-biking, snowshoeing, and cross-country skiing. Summer activities include paddleboard classes, canoeing excursions, kids fishing programs, and guided moonlight hiking.

History
Monticello was platted in 1854. A post office has been in operation at Monticello since 1855. Monticello was incorporated in 1856. The nearby village of Moritzious merged with Monticello in 1891.

On May 3, 2006, the Monticello Middle School had an electrical fire from the large amount of rain settling on the roof. The smoke damage to the school caused the school to be closed for the rest of the school year.  As a result, middle school and high school students had to share usage of the high school building on an alternate-day schedule.  The school year did not get extended, and the clean up was completed in time for the 2006–07 school year.

Economy
In anticipation of rapid population growth, Monticello created a comprehensive growth plan in 1996.  A new high school was constructed in 1999.  A new highway interchange was completed in 2006 on the east end of town, allowing residents full access to Interstate 94 from Wright County Road 18. Since 2002, many retail outlets have been constructed, including Fleet Farm, Wal-Mart Supercenter, SuperTarget store, Muller Family Movie Theatre, River City Extreme Bowling & Restaurant, Home Depot, Marshalls, Applebee's, Taco John's, Arby's, Dollar Tree, Auto Zone, Aldi and Goodwill.  This planned growth has also brought new auto dealerships, hotels, and industrial development.  A 2004 annexation agreement with Monticello Township is expected to help sustain Monticello's growth for the next twenty years.

Top employers
According to Monticello's 2021 Annual Comprehensive  Financial Report (ACFR), its top employers are:

* denotes tied ranks

Education
Monticello is in the Monticello School District. Parts of nearby Monticello Township are in St. Michael-Albertville Schools.

Monticello High School is Wright County's third-largest school, with an estimated attendance of 1,314. The school's athletic teams were formerly known as the Redmen and are now the Magic.

Demographics

As of 2000 the median income for a household in the city was $45,384, and the median income for a family was $53,566. Males had a median income of $41,057 versus $25,854 for females. The per capita income for the city was $19,229.  About 4.2% of families and 4.6% of the population were below the poverty line, including 4.8% of those under age 18 and 7.4% of those age 65 or over.

2010 census
As of the census of 2010, there were 12,759 people, 4,693 households, and 3,164 families residing in the city. The racial makeup of the city was 92.6% White, 1.5% African American, 0.5% Native American, 1.0% Asian, 2.3% from other races, and 2.1% from two or more races. Hispanic or Latino of any race were 5.4% of the population.

There were 4,693 households, of which 43.1% had children under the age of 18 living with them, 49.2% were married couples living together, 12.2% had a female householder with no husband present, 6.0% had a male householder with no wife present, and 32.6% were non-families. 25.5% of all households were made up of individuals, and 9.5% had someone living alone who was 65 years of age or older. The average household size was 2.68 and the average family size was 3.23.

The median age in the city was 31.4 years. 30.8% of residents were under the age of 18; 7.7% were between the ages of 18 and 24; 33.3% were from 25 to 44; 18.7% were from 45 to 64; and 9.5% were 65 years of age or older. The gender makeup of the city was 49.2% male and 50.8% female.

Government
The City Council of Monticello consists of the mayor and four councilmembers, with the mayor serving an elected two-year and councilmembers serving four-year staggered terms. The current mayor is Lloyd Hilgart, who took office in January 2023.

Media

Newspapers
The local newspaper is The Monticello Times.

Notable people
 Tobias Mealey – early Minnesota pioneer and politician. A significant reason that the Rand House was built in Monticello (for his daughter).
 Joel Przybilla – an American professional basketball player, who last played for the Milwaukee Bucks of the NBA. He is a Monticello High School alumnus.

References

External links
 Monticello – Official City Website
 Discover Monticello website
 Monticello Chamber of Commerce website
 Monticello Community Center website
 Monticello School District website
 Monticello Times website
 Monticello Arts Council Website
 Monticello History Website

Cities in Minnesota
Cities in Wright County, Minnesota
Minnesota populated places on the Mississippi River
Populated places established in 1856